Robert Suart (1882 – 27 September 1918) was an English professional footballer who played in the Football League for Stockport County and Fulham as a wing half. He was killed in action during the First World War.

Career
After beginning his career in non-League football with Edgeley, Suart played in the Football League for Stockport County and Fulham, before joining Central League club Port Vale in July 1911. He helped the "Valeites" to win the 1911–12 Staffordshire Senior Cup, the 1912–13 Birmingham Senior Cup and the 1914–15 North Staffordshire Infirmary Cup. Vale went into abeyance in 1915 and Suart returned to Stockport County as a guest.

World War I
During the second year of the First World War in 1915, Suart enlisted as a private in the South Lancashire Regiment. He transferred to the Royal Warwickshire Regiment later that year and went on to see action at High Wood, Guillemont, Flers-Courcelette, Morval, Le Transloy, Arras and the Third Battle of Ypres during 1916 and 1917. His division was transferred to the Italian Front following the Third Battle of Ypres, but returned to France in April 1918. Suart was killed during a German counter-attack near Gouzeaucourt on 27 September 1918, just over six weeks before the Armistice. He is commemorated on the Vis-en-Artois Memorial.

Career statistics

Honours
Port Vale
Staffordshire Senior Cup: 1911–12
Birmingham Senior Cup: 1912–13
North Staffordshire Infirmary Cup: 1914–15

References

1882 births
1918 deaths
Footballers from Stockport
English footballers
Association football wing halves
Stockport County F.C. players
Fulham F.C. players
Port Vale F.C. players
Stockport County F.C. wartime guest players
English Football League players
British Army personnel of World War I
Royal Warwickshire Fusiliers soldiers
Military personnel from Cheshire
South Lancashire Regiment soldiers
British military personnel killed in World War I